Barrymore was a light entertainment show in the United Kingdom, produced by LWT for ITV between 21 December 1991 and 29 December 2000.

Transmissions

External links
 

1991 British television series debuts
2000 British television series endings
Television series by ITV Studios
London Weekend Television shows
Michael Barrymore